State Highway 349 (SH 349) is a  state highway in the western part of Texas, United States.

History

The original formation of the highway on August 3, 1943 included only the section from Rankin to Midland, replacing FM 9. On April 30, 1947, FM 306 and FM 177 were redesignated to form the segment of SH 349 from Midland to near Lamesa. The section from Sheffield to Rankin was added on October 24, 1956 by redesignating part of SH 51.

The part of SH 349 south of Sheffield was Farm to Market Road 1217, which was designated on July 14, 1949 from Dryden northward . The designation was extended  on September 29, 1954 to the end of FM 1749, which was cancelled and combined with FM 1217, adding  and bringing its southern terminus to Sheffield. On December 13, 1956, FM 1217 was signed, but not designated, as part of SH 349. On August 29, 1990, FM 1217 was officially renumbered as SH 349. On July 31, 2003, SH 349 was rerouted around Midland.

In December 2014, the Texas Transportation Commission approved an extension of the SH 349 designation south of Lamesa, from the current northern terminus at SH 137 eastward to US 87. , this segment has not been constructed. Construction of the extension started in May 2017 and was completed just over two years later in mid-2019.

Route description

SH 349 runs generally northward from its originating junction with U.S. Highway 90 at the tiny town of Dryden (population 13) near the Rio Grande, the southern border of the state. The road passes west of Fort Lancaster to Sheffield and a junction with Interstate 10. SH 349 then runs along the Pecos River to Iraan, where it is co-routed for a few miles with U.S. Highway 190. The road then proceeds northward to a junction and brief co-routing with U.S. Highway 67 at Rankin. SH 349 continues northward to the relatively heavily populated area of Midland.

SH 349 formerly bisected Midland directly through the city center. However, the highway has been redesignated to loop around Midland to the west, by co-routing it with portions of Interstate 20 (and State Highway 158) and Farm to Market Road 1788. A new section of highway, a so-called "reliever route", was opened on December 10, 2009, and was named the Nadine and Tom Craddick Highway after State Rep. Tom Craddick and his wife, who played a large role in creating the highway.  (This new section of SH 349 is part of the "La Entrada al Pacifico Corridor" trade route from west Texas to Mexico). The portion of SH 349 that ran directly through Midland was redesignated as Business State Highway 349-C (BS 349-C) in 2003. North of Midland, SH 349 proceeds generally northward to its final junction with State Highway 137, just south of Lamesa. Counties traversed by the highway include Terrell, Pecos, Crockett, Upton, Midland, Martin and Dawson. With the exception of the metropolitan area of Midland, most of the terrain covered by the highway is sparsely populated ranch country.

Business routes
SH 349 has one business route.

Martin-Midland business loop

Business State Highway 349-C (Bus. SH 349-C) is a business loop that runs on the former routing of SH 349 through Midland. The route was designated in 2003 when SH 349 was re-routed around the city.

Junction list

Junction list

See also

References

External links

Texas official travel map at the Texas Department of Transportation (enlargement required for legibility)
Construction notice for new portion of SH 349 to complete loop to the western side of Midland

349
Transportation in Dawson County, Texas
Transportation in Martin County, Texas
Transportation in Midland County, Texas
Transportation in Upton County, Texas
Transportation in Crockett County, Texas
Transportation in Pecos County, Texas
Transportation in Terrell County, Texas